Vablya is a rural locality and the administrative center of Vablinsky Selsoviet Rural Settlement, Konyshyovsky District, Kursk Oblast, Russia. Population:

Geography 
The village is located on the Vablya River (a tributary of the Prutishche in the basin of the Seym), 72.5 km from the Russia–Ukraine border, 56.5 km north-west of Kursk, 16 km north-west of the district center – the urban-type settlement Konyshyovka.

 Climate
Vablya has a warm-summer humid continental climate (Dfb in the Köppen climate classification).

Transport 

The rural locality is situated 61 km from Kursk Vostochny Airport, 164 km from Belgorod International Airport and 261 km from Voronezh Peter the Great Airport.

References

Notes

Sources

Rural localities in Konyshyovsky District
Dmitriyevsky Uyezd